In Celtic cultures, a bard is a professional story teller, verse-maker, music composer, oral historian and genealogist, employed by a patron (such as a monarch or chieftain) to commemorate one or more of the patron's ancestors and to praise the patron's own activities.

With the decline of a living bardic tradition in the modern period, the term has loosened to mean a generic minstrel or author (especially a famous one). For example, William Shakespeare and Rabindranath Tagore are respectively known as "the Bard of Avon" (often simply "the Bard") and "the Bard of Bengal". In 16th-century Scotland, it turned into a derogatory term for an itinerant musician; nonetheless it was later romanticised by Sir Walter Scott (1771–1832).

Etymology
It also appears as a stem in bardo-cucullus ('bard's hood'), bardo-magus ('field of the bard'), barditus (a song to fire soldiers), and in bardala ('crested lark', a singing bird).

All of these terms come from the Proto-Celtic noun  ('poet-singer, minstrel'), itself derived, with regular Celtic sound shift  > , from the Proto-Indo-European compound , which literally means 'praise-maker'. It is cognate with Sanskrit:  ('calls, praise'),  ('grateful, pleasant, delightful'),  ('praise'), and Armenian:  ('raise voice').

History
In the words of the Oxford English Dictionary, the bards were an "ancient Celtic order of minstrel-poets, whose primary function appears to have been to compose and sing (usually to the harp) verses celebrating the achievements of chiefs and warriors, and who committed to verse historical and traditional facts, religious precepts, laws, genealogies, etc."

In medieval Gaelic and Welsh society, a bard (Scottish and Irish Gaelic) or bardd (Welsh) was a professional poet, employed to compose elegies for his lord. If the employer failed to pay the proper amount, the bard would then compose a satire (c.f. fili, fáith). In other Indo-European societies, the same function was fulfilled by skalds, rhapsodes, minstrels and scops, among others. A hereditary caste of professional poets in Proto-Indo-European society has been reconstructed by comparison of the position of poets in medieval Ireland and in ancient India in particular.

Bards (who are not the same as the Irish  or ) were those who sang the songs recalling the tribal warriors' deeds of bravery as well as the genealogies and family histories of the ruling strata among Celtic societies. The pre-Christian Celtic people recorded no written histories; however, Celtic peoples did maintain an intricate oral history committed to memory and transmitted by bards and filid. Bards facilitated the memorization of such materials by the use of metre, rhyme and other formulaic poetic devices.

Regions

Ireland

In medieval Ireland, bards were one of two distinct groups of poets, the other being the fili. According to the Early Irish law text on status, Uraicecht Becc, bards were a lesser class of poets, not eligible for higher poetic roles as described above. However, it has also been argued that the distinction between filid (pl. of fili) and bards was a creation of Christian Ireland, and that the filid were more associated with the church.  By the Early Modern Period, these names came to be used interchangeably.

Irish bards formed a professional hereditary caste of highly trained, learned poets. The bards were steeped in the history and traditions of clan and country, as well as in the technical requirements of a verse technique that was syllabic and used assonance, half rhyme and alliteration, among other conventions. As officials of the court of king or chieftain, they performed a number of official roles. They were chroniclers and satirists whose job it was to praise their employers and damn those who crossed them. It was believed that a well-aimed bardic satire, could raise boils on the face of its target.

The bardic system lasted until the mid-17th century in Ireland and the early 18th century in Scotland. In Ireland, their fortunes had always been linked to the Gaelic aristocracy, which declined along with them during the Tudor Reconquest.

The early history of the bards can be known only indirectly through mythological stories. The first mention of the bardic profession in Ireland is found in the Book of Invasions, in a story about the Irish colony of Tuatha Dé Danann (Peoples of Goddess Danu), also called Danonians. They became the aos sí (folk of the mound), comparable to Norse alfr and British fairy. During the tenth year of the reign of the last Belgic monarch, the people of the colony of Tuatha Dé Danann, as the Irish called it, invaded and settled in Ireland. They were divided into three tribes—the tribe of Tuatha who were the nobility, the tribe of De who were the priests (those devoted to serving God or De) and the tribe of Danann, who were the bards. This account of the Tuatha Dé Danann must be considered legendary; however the story was an integral part of the oral history of Irish bards themselves. One of the most notable bards in Irish mythology was Amergin Glúingel, a bard, druid and judge for the Milesians.

Scotland

The best-known group of bards in Scotland were the members of the MacMhuirich family, who flourished from the 15th to the 18th centuries. The family was centred in the Hebrides, and claimed descent from a 13th-century Irish bard who, according to legend, was exiled to Scotland. The family was at first chiefly employed by the Lords of the Isles as poets, lawyers, and physicians. With the fall of the Lordship of the Isles in the 15th century, the family was chiefly employed by the chiefs of the MacDonalds of Clanranald. Members of the family were also recorded as musicians in the early 16th century, and as clergymen possibly as early as the early 15th century. The last of the family to practise classical Gaelic poetry was Domhnall MacMhuirich, who lived on South Uist in the 18th century.

In Gaelic-speaking areas, a village bard or village poet is a local poet who composes works in a traditional style relating to that community.

Wales

A number of bards in Welsh mythology have been preserved in medieval Welsh literature such as the Red Book of Hergest, the White Book of Rhydderch, the Book of Aneirin and the Book of Taliesin. The bards Aneirin and Taliesin may be legendary reflections of historical bards active in the 6th and 7th centuries. Very little historical information about Dark Age Welsh court tradition survives, but the Middle Welsh material came to be the nucleus of the Matter of Britain and Arthurian legend as they developed from the 13th century. The (Welsh) Laws of Hywel Dda, originally compiled around 900, identify a bard as a member of a king's household. His duties, when the bodyguard were sharing out booty, included the singing of the sovereignty of Britain—possibly why the genealogies of the British high kings survived into the written historical record.

The royal form of bardic tradition ceased in the 13th century, when the 1282 Edwardian conquest permanently ended the rule of the Welsh princes. The legendary suicide of The Last Bard (c. 1283), was commemorated in the poem The Bards of Wales by the Hungarian poet János Arany in 1857, as a way of encoded resistance to the suppressive politics of his own time. However, the poetic and musical traditions were continued throughout the Middle Ages, e.g., by noted 14th-century poets Dafydd ap Gwilym and Iolo Goch. The tradition of regularly assembling bards at an eisteddfod never lapsed, and was strengthened by formation of the Gorsedd by Iolo Morganwg in 1792, establishing Wales as the major Celtic upholder of bardic tradition in the 21st century. Many regular eisteddfodau are held in Wales, including the National Eisteddfod of Wales, which was instituted in 1861 and has been held annually since 1880. Many Welsh schools conduct their own annual versions at which bardic traditions are emulated.

Literature

From its frequent use in Romanticism, 'The Bard' became attached as a title to various  poets,
 'The Bard of Armagh' is Martin Hearty
 'The Bard of Avon,' 'The Immortal Bard' or (in England) simply 'The Bard' is William Shakespeare
 'The Bard of Ayrshire' (or in Scotland, simply 'The Bard') is Robert Burns
 'The Bard of Bengal' is Rabindranath Tagore
 'The Bard of Olney' is William Cowper
 'The Bard of Rydal Mount' is William Wordsworth
 'The Bard of Salford' is John Cooper Clarke
 'The Bard of Twickenham' is Alexander Pope
 Australian bush poets such as Henry Lawson and Banjo Paterson are referred to as 'bush bards'
 Bob Dylan, Jim MacCool and the band Blind Guardian have also been termed 'bards'

Popular culture
From its Romanticist usage, the notion of the bard as a minstrel with qualities of a priest, magician or seer also entered the fantasy genre in the 1960s to 1980s, for example as the 'Bard' class in Dungeons & Dragons and Pathfinder, Bard by Keith Taylor (1981), Bard: The Odyssey of the Irish by Morgan Llywelyn (1984), in video games in fantasy settings such as The Bard's Tale (1985), and in modern literature and TV like The Witcher books by Andrzej Sapkowski(1986–2013) show by  Lauren Schmidt Hissrich (2019).

As of 2020, an online trend to cover modern songs using medieval style musical instruments and composition, including rewriting the lyrics in a medieval style, is known as bardcore.

See also

 Aois-dàna
 Bard (Dungeons & Dragons)
 Bard (League of Legends)
 Bard (Soviet Union)
 Bhāts
 Cacofonix
 Charan (India)
 Contention of the bards
 Druid
 Fili
 Gorsedd
 Gorseth Kernow (Cornwall)
 Griot 
 Poet as legislator
 Skald
 The Bards of Wales
 The Bard's Tale (1985 video game)
 Vates
 Welsh bardic music

References

Citations

Bibliography

Further reading
 Walker, Joseph C., Historical Memoirs of the Irish Bards. New York: Garland, 1971.

External links

 Irish Bardic Poetry Corpus of Electronic Texts, University College Cork.
 

Occupations in music
Celtic culture
History of Wales
Irish literature
Scottish literature
Welsh literature
Welsh folk music
Welsh poets
Medieval Ireland
Culture of medieval Scotland
Cornish culture
Romanticism
Eisteddfod
Medieval performers
Poets